The Democratic Forces of Guiana (FDG) is a centrist and social-liberal political party in the French overseas région of French Guiana, in South America. The FDG had one Senator until the 2008 elections, Georges Othily who sat in the RDSE group in the Senate.

The party is close to the Modern Left.

1992 establishments in French Guiana
Organizations established in 1992
Political parties established in 2000
Political parties in French Guiana
Socialist parties in France